Fabio Enrique Castro (born January 20, 1985), is a Dominican former professional baseball pitcher, who played in Major League Baseball (MLB) for the Texas Rangers and Philadelphia Phillies, from  to .

Career

Chicago White Sox
He was originally signed by the Chicago White Sox as an amateur free agent on December 26, 2001. He played in the White Sox farm system through 2005 with stops at Bristol, Kannapolis and Winston-Salem, reaching as high as Class "A".

Texas Rangers
Castro was the first pick in the 2005 Rule 5 Draft by the Kansas City Royals on December 8, 2005. He was then traded to the Texas Rangers for second baseman Esteban Germán. He made his major league debut on April 6, 2006, for the Rangers against the Detroit Tigers, pitching 3.2 innings and allowing one earned run. He appeared in 4 games for the Rangers, and had an E.R.A. of 4.32 in 8.1 innings pitched.

Philadelphia Phillies
He was traded to the Philadelphia Phillies on June 29, 2006, for a minor leaguer and pitched in 16 games for the Phillies the rest of the season, with a 1.54 ERA.

In 2007, Castro made 10 appearances for the Phillies, including making his first career Major League start, on August 23 against the Los Angeles Dodgers. He had a 6.00 ERA that season for the club, while also pitching in 11 games for the AA Reading Phillies and 21 games for the AAA Ottawa Lynx.

Toronto Blue Jays
Castro was traded to the Toronto Blue Jays on September 29, 2008, to complete a trade for Matt Stairs. With the Blue Jays organization, he spent the season with the AAA Las Vegas 51s, compiling a 7–6 record and 4.49 ERA in 25 starts.

Boston Red Sox
Castro signed a minor league contract with the Boston Red Sox on December 7, 2009. He spent the season with the Pawtucket Red Sox, where he was 7–9 with a 4.93 ERA in 31 appearances (15 starts).

Castro was designated for assignment on June 29, 2010, to make room for recently acquired Eric Patterson.

Seattle Mariners
Castro signed a minor league contract with the Seattle Mariners for the 2011 season. He spent that season with the Tacoma Rainiers, where he was 5–4 with a 3.63 ER in 24 appearances (12 starts).

Oakland Athletics
On January 6, 2012, he signed a minor league contract with the Oakland Athletics. He finished the season with a 5.60 ERA, while pitching for the Midland RockHounds and Sacramento River Cats.

Los Angeles Dodgers
On 23 November 2012, Castro was reported to sign a minor league contract with the San Francisco Giants. However, that report was in error, as he was subsequently signed by the Los Angeles Dodgers to a minor league contract on December 19, 2012. The Dodgers released him in March 2013.

Tigres de Quintana Roo
On May 20, 2013, Castro signed with the Tigres de Quintana Roo of the Mexican Baseball League. He became a free agent after the 2014 season.

Saraperos de Saltillo
On April 3, 2015, Castro signed with the Saraperos de Saltillo of the Mexican Baseball League. He was released on April 13, 2015.

Toros de Tijuana
On July 7, 2015, Castro signed with the Toros de Tijuana of the Mexican Baseball League. He was released on January 20, 2016.

References

External links

Fabio Castro at Pura Pelota (Venezuelan Professional Baseball League)

1985 births
Living people
Bristol White Sox players
Central American and Caribbean Games bronze medalists for the Dominican Republic
Dominican Republic expatriate baseball players in Canada
Dominican Republic expatriate baseball players in Mexico
Dominican Republic expatriate baseball players in the United States
Frisco RoughRiders players
Gigantes del Cibao players
Kannapolis Intimidators players
Las Vegas 51s players

Lehigh Valley IronPigs players
Major League Baseball pitchers
Major League Baseball players from the Dominican Republic
Mexican League baseball pitchers
Midland RockHounds players
New Hampshire Fisher Cats players
Oklahoma RedHawks players
Ottawa Lynx players
Pawtucket Red Sox players
Philadelphia Phillies players
Reading Phillies players
Sacramento River Cats players
Saraperos de Saltillo players
Tacoma Rainiers players
Texas Rangers players
Tigres de Quintana Roo players
Winston-Salem Warthogs players
Competitors at the 2002 Central American and Caribbean Games
Central American and Caribbean Games medalists in baseball